, also known as Exchange Students, is a 1982 Japanese fantasy film directed by Nobuhiko Obayashi. Obayashi himself directed and co-wrote a second film based on the same novel, premiered in 2007 and titled .

Cast
 Toshinori Omi as Kazuo Saitō
 Satomi Kobayashi as Kazumi Saitō
 Makoto Satō as Akio Saitō (father of Kazuo)
 Kirin Kiki as Naoko Saitō (mother of Kazuo)
 Jō Shishido as Kouzou Saitō (father of Kazumi)
 Wakaba Irie as Chie Saitō (Mother of Kazumi)
 Masuno Takahashi as Masuno Saitō (Grandma)
 Munenori Iwamoto as Masaaki Kaneko
 Daisuke Ohyama as Kenji Sakui
 Etsuko Shihomi as Mitsuko Ono

Goodbye Me Cast
 Misako Renbutsu as Kazumi Saito
 Misa Shimizu as Naoko Saito
 Tomorowo Taguchi as Kozo Saito
 Joe Shishido as Yoshinojo Yoshida
 Hiroshi Inuzuka as Konosuke Saito
 Hiroyuki Nagato as Masao Imada

Awards
4th Yokohama Film Festival 
Won: Best Film
Won: Best Screenplay – Wataru Kenmochi
Won: Best Newcomer – Satomi Kobayashi

References

External links

1982 films
Body swapping in films
Films based on Japanese novels
Films based on speculative fiction novels
Films directed by Nobuhiko Obayashi
Nippon TV films
Japanese fantasy films
Japanese high school films
1980s Japanese-language films
Shochiku films
Toho films
Transgender-related films
1980s Japanese films